Pepe Julian Onziema (born June 09, 1980) is a Swiss-born transgender LGBT rights and human rights activist.  He began his human rights work in 2003, which has twice led to his arrest.  He has since participated in organizing LGBT pride celebrations in Uganda.

Morning Breeze interview
On December 18, 2012, he was invited on the Ugandan television show Morning Breeze hosted by Simon Kaggwa Njala, to join a debate about sexual minorities and their situation in Uganda. The interview later turned into a wild dispute when pastor and anti-gay activist Martin Ssempa came into the show trying to discredit Onziema, with fruits and vegetables, while shouting in both English and Luganda over the moderator. The interview itself was uploaded to the internet and became the subject of various internet memes, commonly titled Why Are You Gay?.

Awards and other media appearances
In 2012, he was named a Global Citizen by the Clinton Global Initiative for his work in human rights advocacy.

In 2013, Pepe was shortlisted for the David Kato Vision and Voice Award, an award in honour of his murdered friend and colleague, and fellow advocacy officer for Sexual Minorities Uganda, David Kato.

In 2014, he was interviewed by John Oliver on the American television series Last Week Tonight about the human rights situation for LGBT people in Uganda.  Stonewall selected Onziema as Hero of the Year in 2014.

Personal life
Onziema initially identified as lesbian, and now lives as a trans man. He lives in Kampala.

See also
LGBT rights in Uganda
Stella Nyanzi

References

1980 births
Living people
Ugandan transgender people
Ugandan LGBT rights activists
People from Kampala
Transgender men
Prisoners and detainees of Uganda
Ugandan prisoners and detainees
21st-century Ugandan LGBT people